Mátyás Usztics (9 April 1949 – 29 April 2017) was a Hungarian stage and film actor, most notable for his role of Sgt. János Karádi in the Hungarian television show Angyalbőrben. As a regular voice actor too, he was the Hungarian dubbing voice of Roger Rabbit in Who Framed Roger Rabbit and Gopher in The Many Adventures of Winnie the Pooh. He served as founding director of the National Chamber Theatre from 2003 until his death.

Usztics was a founding member and "commander" of the Magyar Gárda, de facto paramilitary wing of the nationalist Jobbik party. He resigned from his position after three months.

Selected filmography

 Csutak és a szürke ló (1961)
 Magyar rapszódia (1979)
 Allegro barbaro (1979)
 Angi Vera (1979)
 Rosszemberek (1979) - Vekóczi
 Kinek a törvénye? (1979) - Csatkai
 Vasárnapi szülök (1980) - Juli sógora
 Fábián Bálint találkozása Istennel (1980) - Balla Károly unokája
 Circus maximus (1980) - Öcsi
 A mérközés (1981)
 A zsarnok szíve, avagy Boccaccio Magyarországon (1981)
 Requiem (1982) - Szabadult fogoly
 Cha-Cha-Cha (1983) - Sztásni
  (1983) - Gömöri
 Délibábok országa (1983)
 Könnyü testi sértés (1983)
 Tight Quarters (1983) - Swede
 Az óriás (1984)
 Uramisten (1984)
 Házasság szabadnappal (1984) - Csaba
 Flowers of Reverie (1985) - Rendõrparancsnok
 Mata Hari (1985) - Stable N.C.O.
 Dráma a vadászaton (1986)
 Az erdö kapitánya (1988) - Sanislo (voice)
 Willy the Sparrow (1989) - Spagyi, a fõveréb (voice)
 Angyalbőrben (1990–1991, TV Series) - Karádi õrmester
 Stalin (1992, TV Movie) - Yezhov
 Kutyabaj (1992)
 Kisváros (1993–1999, TV Series) - Hunyadi János fõtörzs
 Macskafogó 2 - A sátán macskája (2007) - Mióka (voice)
 The Tragedy of Man (2011) - Lucifer (voice) (final film role)

References

External links

1949 births
2017 deaths
People from Szabolcs-Szatmár-Bereg County
Hungarian male television actors
Hungarian male film actors